This is an article about qualification for the 2015 Men's European Volleyball Championship.

Qualification summary
Qualified teams

Hosts

Directly qualified after 2013 edition

Qualified through qualification
Group A: 
Group B: 
Group C: 
Group D: 
Group E: 
Group F: 
Play-off 1: 
Play-off 2: 
Play-off 3:

First round

First round  was held 9–18 May 2014. 12 teams competed in three First Round tournaments consisting of 4 teams. The three 1st placed teams and the two 2nd placed teams with the best score qualified for the Second Round.

All times are local.

Pool A
The tournament was held at d'Coque in Luxembourg, Luxembourg.

|}

|}

Pool B
The tournament was held at Messzi István Sportcsarnok in Kecskemét, Hungary.

|}

|}

Pool C
The tournament was held at the Sportska sala "Park" in Strumica, Macedonia.

|}

|}

Second round
24 teams competed in the Second Round, where each pool of 4 teams played in 2 tournaments in May–June 2014 (the last competition day must be on a Saturday or a Sunday). The 1st placed teams of each pool qualify directly for the 2015 Championship. The 2nd placed teams of each pool qualify for the Third Round.

Group A
The tournament was held at the Centennial Hall in Wrocław, Poland and Arena Stožice in Ljubljana, Slovenia.

|}

 Tournament 1 in Poland

|}

 Tournament 2 in Slovenia

|}

Group B
The tournament was held at the Pavilhão De Desportos De Vila Do Conde in Vila do Conde, Portugal, and Energia Areena in Vantaa, Finland.

|}

 Tournament 1 in Portugal

|}

 Tournament 2 in Finland

|}

Group C
The tournament was held at the Aréna Poprad in Poprad, Slovakia and Melina Merkouri Indoor Hall in Rentis, Greece.

|}

 Tournament 1 in Slovakia

|}

 Tournament 2 in Greece

|}

Group D
The tournament was held at the City Hall in Jablonec nad Nisou, Czech Republic and Polideportivo Príncipes de Asturias in Pinto, Spain.

|}

 Tournament 1 in Czech Republic

|}

 Tournament 2 in Spain

|}

Group E
The tournament was held at the Morača Sports Center in Podgorica, Montenegro and Dom odbojke - Bojan Stranić in Zagreb, Croatia.

|}

 Tournament 1 in Montenegro

|}

 Tournament 2 in Croatia

|}

Group F
The tournament was held at the Antvorskovhallen in Slagelse, Denmark, and Chizhovka-Arena Team Sports Hall in Minsk, Belarus.

|}

 Tournament 1 in Denmark

|}

 Tournament 2 in Belarus

|}

Third round
The 2nd placed teams of the Second Round will play one home and one away match to determine the 3 winners who will then subsequently be qualified through to the 2015 Championship. The third round matches were held on 23–24 and 30–31 May 2015.

|}

First leg

|}

Second leg

|}

External links
Official website
Regulations

Q
2014 in volleyball
2015 in volleyball
Qualification for volleyball competitions